William Hyndman III (December 25, 1915 – September 6, 2001) was an American amateur golfer.

Hyndman was born in Glenside, Pennsylvania. Hyndman won many amateur tournaments, over an almost 50-year span, including the U.S. Senior Amateur twice (1973 and 1983). He was runner-up in four major amateur tournaments, the 1955 U.S. Amateur and the 1959, 1969, and 1970 British Amateurs. He played on five Walker Cup teams (1957, 1959, 1961, 1969, 1971) and on the Eisenhower Trophy twice (1958, 1960). He defeated Jack Nicklaus in the 1959 British Amateur.

Hyndman died Huntingdon Valley, Pennsylvania.

Tournament wins
1935 Philadelphia Amateur
1941 Pennsylvania Amateur
1958 Philadelphia Amateur
1961 North and South Amateur
1958 Sunnehanna Amateur
1965 Philadelphia Amateur
1967 Sunnehanna Amateur
1968 Philadelphia Open Championship, Trans-Mississippi Amateur
1969 Philadelphia Open Championship
1973 U.S. Senior Amateur
1974 Northeast Amateur
1980 Philadelphia Senior Amateur
1983 U.S. Senior Amateur – oldest USGA champion at that time
American Seniors Golf Association Stroke Play Championship 1970, 1971, 1974, 1978, 1980
American Seniors Golf Association Match Play Championship 1973, 1977

Tournament runner-up finishes
1955 U.S. Amateur – 2nd to Harvie Ward
1959 British Amateur – 2nd to Deane Beman
1969 British Amateur – 2nd to Michael Bonallack
1970 British Amateur – 2nd to Michael Bonallack

Results in major championships

CUT = missed the half-way cut
WD = Withdrew
R256, R128, R64, R32, R16, QF, SF = Round in which player lost in match play
"T" indicates a tie for a place

Source for The Masters: www.masters.com

Source for U.S. Amateur and U.S. Open: USGA Championship Database

U.S. national team appearances
Walker Cup: 1957 (winners), 1959 (winners), 1961 (winners), 1969 (winners), 1971
Eisenhower Trophy: 1958 (individual leader, tie), 1960 (winners)
Americas Cup: 1958 (winners), 1960 (winners), 1961 (winners)

References

American male golfers
Amateur golfers
Golfers from Pennsylvania
People from Montgomery County, Pennsylvania
People from Cheltenham, Pennsylvania
1915 births
2001 deaths